Ned or NED may refer to:

People
 Ned (given name)
 Ned (Scottish), a slang term for a Scottish urban youth who engages in hooliganism

Organisations
 National Endowment for Democracy, a U.S. non-profit organization
 NED University of Engineering and Technology, named after Nadirshaw Edulji Dinshaw, located in Karachi, Sindh, Pakistan

In arts and entertainment
 Ned (film), a 2003 Australian film
 Neds (film), a 2010 British film
 N.E.D., a rock band consisted of medical doctors
 Ned, the title character of Ned's Declassified School Survival Guide, a Nickelodeon sitcom
 Ned, the title character of Ned's Newt, a 1990s Canadian animated series
 Ned, the title character of The Misfortune of Being Ned, a webseries
For a full list of fictional characters named Ned, see Ned (given name)#Fictional characters.

In science, technology and medicine
 Named entity disambiguation, the task of determining the identity of entities mentioned in text
 Nano-emissive display, a type of flat panel display
 NASA/IPAC Extragalactic Database, a database of information on astronomical objects outside the Milky Way galaxy
 National Elevation Dataset, topographic data
 NED, National edeposit, an Australian online depository for legal deposit of electronic documents
 NED, acronym for "No evidence of disease", a term used by oncologists to describe the condition of a person with cancer who has been successfully treated and is in complete remission
 North east down axial system
 NED, acronym for "Nasal EPAP Dilator," a term used for a nasal device that combines nasal dilation with nasal EPAP (Expiratory Positive Air Pressure) to treat snoring and sleep disordered breathing

In business
 New England Digital, a discontinued company producing music synthesizers
 A non-executive director of a company

Other uses
 Ned, Tullyhunco, a townland in the parish of Killeshandra, barony of Tullyhunco, county of Cavan, Republic of Ireland
 Nederland, or the Netherlands, a country of which the IOC and FIFA abbreviation is NED
 "New Engine Desperado", a type of UK railfan, see Glossary of United Kingdom railway terms
 New English Dictionary, the original title of the Oxford English Dictionary